Hasim Nagar is a small village in Odisha, India. It belongs to the Jagatsinghpur district. The 2011 Census of India states that there are one hundred eighty four people live in the village, with a literacy rate of 90.64%, which is well above the Odisha state average of 72.87%.

References

External links

Villages in Jagatsinghpur district